Augusta Marie of Holstein-Gottorp (1649–1728) was a German noblewoman. She was the daughter of Frederick III, Duke of Holstein-Gottorp and Duchess Marie Elisabeth of Saxony. Through her daughter Albertine Frederica, she is a female line great-grandmother of Catherine II and great-great-grandmother of Paul I of Russia.

She married Frederick VII, Margrave of Baden-Durlach on 15 May 1670 in Husum. They had the following children:
 Frederick Magnus (13 January 1672 – 24 February 1672)
 Frederica Augusta (21 June 1673 – 24 July 1674)
 Christina Sophia (17 December 1674 – 22 January 1676)
 Klaudia Magdalene Elisabeth (15 November 1675 – 18 April 1676)
 Catherine (10 October 1677 – 11 August 1746), in 1701 she married the count Johann Friedrich von Leiningen-Hartenburg
 Charles III William, Margrave of Baden-Durlach (17 January 1679 – 12 May 1738), he married Magdalena Wilhelmine of Württemberg
 Johanna Elisabeth of Baden-Durlach (3 October 1680 – 2 July 1757), in 1697 she married Eberhard Louis, Duke of Württemberg
 Albertine Frederica (3 July 1682 – 22 December 1755), in 1704 she married Christian August of Holstein-Gottorp, Prince of Eutin
 Christopher of Baden-Durlach (9 October 1684 – 2 May 1723), he married Marie Christine Felizitas zu Leiningen-Dagsburg-Falkenburg-Heidesheim
 Charlotte Sophia (1 March 1686 – 5 October 1689)
 Marie Anna (9 July 1688 – 8 March 1689)

|-

1649 births
1728 deaths
Margravines of Baden
House of Holstein-Gottorp
Daughters of monarchs